Christine Delaroche (born 24 May 1944) is a French actress and singer. She has appeared in 21 films and television shows since 1965. She starred in the 1966 film Un monde nouveau, which was directed by Vittorio De Sica.

Filmography
 Mouche (film, 1968)
 Belphégor (TV Miniseries - 1965)
 Un monde nouveau (1966)
 The Defector (1966)
 A Crime in Paradise (2001)

Discography
 La Porte à côté (1966)
 La Fille du soleil (1966)

References

External links

1944 births
Living people
French film actresses
Actresses from Paris
20th-century French actresses
French National Academy of Dramatic Arts alumni